Samuel Walker Morris (16 April 1907 – 10 August 1991) was an English professional footballer who played as a wing half for Sunderland.

References

1907 births
1991 deaths
Sportspeople from Prescot
English footballers
Association football wing halves
Prescot Cables F.C. players
Sunderland A.F.C. players
Charlton Athletic F.C. players
Chester City F.C. players
Bath City F.C. players
Weymouth F.C. players
English Football League players